ProjeQtOr is an Open Source project management software. The acronym stands for Quality based Project Organizer, as the software offers quality management features like indicators, alerts and workflow.  Until 2013 it was called Project'Or RIA (Project Organizer Rich Internet Application). It is used as a free alternative to proprietary software in French administration, managing 450 projects for 75 projects managers.

Features offered are, as synthesized by "Find The Best" and "I love free software":
 Management of tasks and milestones
 Work and Teams Management
 Incident Management with bug tracking
 Multi-Projects Management
 Deployment of resources on a project only when necessary
 Storing all project documents in one space
 Risks Management
 Managing budgets and expenses
 Collaborative Web Architecture
 Multi-platforms (Windows, Linux)

Technically ProjeQtOr relies on PHP with a MySQL or PostgreSQL database and the Apache web server.

In the book "Démarche et outil de gestion de portefeuille de projets informatiques"  (approach and tool for project portfolio management), this tool is proposed as a credible free alternative to the proprietary software "Genius Project" (distributed by IBM).

Project sources are available on SourceForge.
Distribution license is GPL V3.
On editor's website, change history shows of a major release about every 2 months since July 2010.

ProjeQtOr is listed as well in AlternativeTo among other valid alternatives.

Notes and references

Software project management